The 2000–01 Hazfi Cup was the 14th season of the Iranian football knockout competition.

Final

Leg 1

Leg 2

References

2000
2000–01 domestic association football cups
2000–01 in Iranian football